L5 or L-5 may refer to:

Entertainment
 L5 (band), French female pop music group
 L5 Games, video games developer published by Gravity Interactive
 Gibson L5, electric guitar
 "Home on Lagrange (The L5 Song)", a filk song

Science
 Haplogroup L5 (mtDNA), human mitochondrial DNA haplogroup
 L5, the fifth lumbar vertebra
 Lagrangian point 5 in an astronomical solar system
 Lp space for p=5
 Ribosomal protein L5, a human gene
 Ubiquitin carboxyl-terminal hydrolase L5, a human gene

Transportation
 Stinson L-5 Sentinel, aircraft used by the United States Army Air Forces in World War II
 Barcelona Metro line 5
 HMS L5, a 1917 British L class submarine
 Junkers L5, a 1920s German six-cylinder, water-cooled, inline aircraft engine
 PRR L5, an American electric locomotive
 SP&S Class L-5, an 1897 steam locomotives class
 Strv L-5, a 1929 Swedish tank designed by Landsverk
 USS L-5 (SS-44), a 1916 United States Navy L-class submarine

Other uses
 L5 Society, a society promoting Dr. Gerard K. O'Neill's vision of space colonization
 ISO/IEC 8859-9 (Latin-5), an 8-bit character encoding

See also
 Level 5 (disambiguation)